Naomi Gal (Hebrew נעמי גל) (b. Jerusalem, 1944) is an Israeli writer. Her novel  (Tel Aviv 1993, in 2011 rewritten in English as Soap Opera), in its original Hebrew version won the Jerusalem Prize for Literature in 1994. In 1999 Ariel, an English-language Israeli literary magazine, counted Gal with Haim Be'er and Dan Tsalka "in the forefront of Israeli writers today". Gal worked in Israeli television and the newspapers Ma'Ariv and Yediot Ahronot for nearly two decades as a film critic and food writer before writing novels and children's books. She currently is a professor at Moravian College in Bethlehem, Pennsylvania. She has also been classed as a feminist writer.

Works
Hebrew:
 "There's a thinness" ("")
 "Roman romanti" ("")
 "Story of Ruth and Jerry" ("")
 "Lilith" ("")
 "Anti-Roman", ("")

English:
 Daphne's Seasons
 Soap Opera

References

External links
 Naomi Gal's official website

1944 births
Writers from Jerusalem
Living people
Feminist writers
Moravian University faculty
Israeli feminists
Israeli film critics
Israeli women film critics
Israeli television people
Maariv (newspaper) people
Yedioth Ahronoth people
Jerusalem Prize recipients
Israeli children's writers
Israeli women children's writers
Israeli women novelists